Ditrigona pruinosa is a moth in the family Drepanidae. It was described by Frederic Moore in 1888. It is found in Darjeeling, India. The Global Lepidoptera Names Index lists it as a synonym of Ditrigona quinaria.

The wingspan is about 15.5 mm. The dorsal surface of the wings and the fringe are heavily speckled with greenish-yellow scales, particularly on the fasciae and wing margins. The ventral surface of all wings is more evenly speckled with dark lemon and the fasciae are absent.

References

Moths described in 1888
Drepaninae
Moths of Asia